"Sugar" is a song by Moldovan singer Natalia Gordienko. The song represented Moldova in the Eurovision Song Contest 2021 in Rotterdam, the Netherlands.

Promotion 
On 1 March 2021, Natalia Gordienko unveiled a short teaser of the song. 

On 9 April 2021, Natalia released Russian version of the song called "Tuz bubi" ("Туз буби"). Music video was also released, it used both new and footage from the original video for "Sugar". The author of the words of the Russian version is Mikhail Gutseriyev.

Composition 
Sugar is an uptempo dance-pop song about sexual attraction, using "give me some sugar" as a metaphor for asking a crush out.

Eurovision Song Contest

Internal selection 
On 26 January 2021, TRM confirmed that Natalia Gordienko would represent Moldova in the 2021 contest.

In Eurovision 
The 65th edition of the Eurovision Song Contest took place in Rotterdam, the Netherlands and consisted of two semi-finals on 18 and 20 May 2021, and the grand final on 22 May 2021. On 17 November 2020, it was announced that Moldova would be performing in the first half of the second semi-final of the contest.

The song was performed in the second semi-final on 20 May, with it being the 7th song performed out of 17 songs that day. Sugar would qualify, finishing 7th with 179 points. Two days later, Sugar would be performed in the Eurovision Song Contest 2021 Grand Final. It would eventually get a total 115 points, making it enough to finish 13th.

During the semi-final performance, before the chorus at the end of the performance, Natalia, instead of saying "Give me some, sugar," belted out "Europe, ah!" The moment quickly went viral in the Eurovision fan community, with many memes and the like being made. She again performed the verse in the jury final for the Grand Final, but after her voice cracked during the line, she eventually switched back to the original line during the Grand Final.

Charts

References 

2021 songs
2021 singles
Eurovision songs of 2021
Eurovision songs of Moldova
Minos EMI singles
Natalia Gordienko songs
Songs written by Sharon Vaughn